Bouladuff, also known as Inch and The Ragg, is a village near Thurles in County Tipperary, Ireland. According to the 2016 CSO census, the population of the Inch electoral division was 395. Bouladuff is in the barony of Eliogarty.

Location and access
Bouladuff (also known as Inch) lies 5 miles from Thurles and 3 miles from Borrisoleigh. The village is set in the Suir valley and bounded by the Silvermine Mountains to the northwest and the Slieveardagh hills to the Southeast. The main road is the R498 regional road from Nenagh to Thurles.
The area around Bouladuff has views of the Devils Bit and Tower mountains.

Amenities
Amenities in the area include Inch National school, Inch Community Hall, and Inch Church (the latter 200 years old).

The village is served by a nightclub and bar, a petrol station and shop, and a restaurant.

The GAA grounds of Drom-Inch GAA club have dressing room facilities and a covered stand.

See also
 List of towns and villages in Ireland

Gallery

References

External links
 Ragg Settlement Plan
 Inch National School
 Monroe Roman Catholic Church - Buildings of Ireland
 Bouladuff House - Buildings of Ireland

Towns and villages in County Tipperary